Bandhan is a Marathi movie released on 5 March 1991. The movie is produced by Chelaram Bhatia and Lalchand Bhatia and directed by Anant Mane.

Cast 

The cast includes Ajinkiya Dev, Nishigandha Wad, Ramesh Bhatkar, Asha Kale, Vasant Shinde, and others.

Producers
The Bhatia duo: Chelaram Bhatia and Lalchand Bhatia. (Glamour Films)

Soundtrack
The music has been provided by Anil Mohile.

Track listing

References

External links 
 Music Album - itunes.apple.com

1991 films
1990s Marathi-language films